Saleh Kutah (also Romanized as Şāleḩ Kūtāh and Saleh Kootah) is a village in Abezhdan Rural District, Abezhdan District, Andika County, Khuzestan Province, Iran. At the 2006 census, its population was 230, in 43 families.

References 

Populated places in Andika County